Dragotina is a village in central Croatia, in the Sisak-Moslavina County, municipality of Glina. It is connected by the D6 highway.

Demographics
According to the 2011 census, the village of Dragotina has 149 inhabitants. This represents 29.74% of its pre-war population according to the 1991 census. 

Population by ethnicity

Religion

Serbian Orthodox Church of the Dormition of the Theotokos
In 1760 local existing Roman Catholic church was converted to Serbian Orthodox Church as the Church of the Dormition of the Theotokos. This medieval church was removed and the new historicist building was completed in 1910. The site is known as a Roman archaeological site and some part of it are reused in the construction of the church. The church was burned by the Ustashe regime during the World War II and its reconstruction was completed in 1988. After the Operation Storm in 1995 church was devastated by the members of Croatian Army and its latest reconstruction was completed in 2000.

Sights
 Monument to the Victims of Fascism - removed from the site and deposited into storage facilities in Glina based on the decision of the Glina Municipal Council dated 18 March 1997

References

External links

Populated places in Sisak-Moslavina County
Serb communities in Croatia
Glina, Croatia